Suzanna Potter Love (born April 8, 1950) is an American former actress known for her appearances in several films directed by her husband, German director Ulli Lommel, in the 1980s.

Early life
Love was born in New York City on April 8, 1950, to Marie Felicité (née Pratt; 19262002) and Kennett Love (19242013). Her father, originally from St. Louis, Missouri, was a correspondent for The New York Times, and covered international affairs extensively in the 1950s. Her mother was a descendant of Charles Pratt, who founded the Pratt Institute. Love grew up in New York City, and attended the Stuart Country Day School of the Sacred Heart in New Jersey; she later attended Vassar College. Love is a Standard Oil heiress.

Acting career
Love married to German film director Ulli Lommel on January 26, 1978, and starred in several of his movies throughout the 1980s, beginning with Blank Generation and the supernatural horror film The Boogeyman in 1980. In 1983, she acted in four of Lommel's films: the psychological thriller Olivia; the science fiction film BrainWaves; the horror film Boogeyman II; and the supernatural horror film The Devonsville Terror, the last of which she co-wrote with Lommel.

In 1984, Love appeared in Lommel's satirical science fiction musical film Strangers in Paradise, in which she portrayed a punk singer, followed by the comedy Revenge of the Stolen Stars (1985).

Later life
Love has largely remained out of the public eye since retiring from acting in 1991, though she did collaborate with Vinegar Syndrome  in 2020, providing an on-camera interview for their Blu-ray release of Olivia, and in 2023 for their release of The Devonsville Terror.

Filmography

References

Sources

External links

1950 births
Living people
Actresses from New York City
American film actresses
Du Pont family
Vassar College alumni
Charles Pratt family